Jungle Heat is a 1957 American adventure film directed by Howard W. Koch and written by Jameson Brewer. The film stars Lex Barker, Mari Blanchard, James Westerfield, Glenn Langan and Miyoko Sasaki. The film was released on July 22, 1957, by United Artists. The film was shot on Kauai, Hawaii back to back with Voodoo Island.

Plot
Prior to the attack on Pearl Harbor, Japanese infiltrators attempt to turn Hawaiian labourers against American plantation owners.

Cast 
Lex Barker as Dr. Jim Ransom
Mari Blanchard as Ann McRae
James Westerfield as Harvey Mathews
Glenn Langan as Roger McRae
Miyoko Sasaki as Kimi-San Grey
Rhodes Reason as Major Richard 'Dick' Grey
Glenn Dixon as Felix Agung
Bob Okazaki as Kuji
Jerry Frank as Corporal

References

External links 
 

1957 films
Films directed by Howard W. Koch
United Artists films
American adventure films
1957 adventure films
1950s English-language films
1950s American films